Levan Chilashvili (August 17, 1930 – April 26, 2004) was a Georgian archaeologist and historian, an academician of the Georgian Academy of Sciences (GAS), Meritorious Scholar of Georgia, Doctor of Historical Sciences, and Professor.

In 1954, he graduated from the Faculty of History of Tbilisi State University (TSU), where he was also a professor from 1967 until his death in 2004. In 1958, Chilashvili received his PhD in history, and in 1967, he received a degree as Doctor of Historical Sciences.

In 1991, he was elected Academician of the Georgian Academy of Sciences (GAS).

Chilashvili was also Director of the Georgian National Museum of the GAS (1980–2004).

In 1982, he was awarded the Simon Janashia Prize of the GAS.

Levan Chilashvili's main fields of scientific inquiry was archaeology and the history of ancient Georgia. From 1995 to 2003, Chilashvili's archaeological expedition in Nekresi (the Kakheti region of Eastern Georgia) discovered early Georgian inscriptions which he controversially dated from the 1st to the 3rd centuries AD.

See also
 List of Georgians

Some of main scientific works of Levan Chilashvili
 "Town of Rustavi" (a monograph), Tbilisi, 1957 (in Georgian)
 "Ancient town Urbnisi" (a monograph), Tbilisi, 1964 (in Georgian)
 "Towns of Kakheti" (a monograph), Tbilisi, 1980 (in Georgian)
 "Areshi" (a monograph), Tbilisi, 1991 (in Georgian)
 "The Pre-Christian Georgian inscription from Nekresi".- E. Khintibidze (Ed.) "Kartvelology", No 7, Tbilisi, 2000

References

1930 births
2004 deaths
Archaeologists from Tbilisi
Soviet archaeologists
20th-century historians from Georgia (country)
Soviet historians
Scientists from Georgia (country)
Academic staff of Tbilisi State University
Members of the Georgian National Academy of Sciences
20th-century archaeologists